CLC may refer to:

Religion
 Christian Life Centre, a number of individual and networked Pentecostal churches in Australia
 Christian Life Community, an international association of lay Christians 
 Church of the Lutheran Confession, an American Lutheran denomination
 CLC International, an international Christian literature mission committed to the distribution of the Bible
 Concordia Lutheran Conference, a group of Lutheran churches

Schools
 Cheltenham Ladies' College, an independent boarding and day school for girls in Cheltenham, United Kingdom.
 College of Lake County, a community college in Grayslake, Illinois
 Contemporary Learning Center, an alternative school district-operated school in Houston, Texas
 Crystal Lake Central High School, a high school in Crystal Lake, Illinois

Science
 CLC (gene), Charcot-Leyden crystal protein, gene for a human enzyme
 CLC bio, a bioinformatics software company headquartered in Denmark
 Chemical looping combustion
 Chinese Library Classification

Transportation
 Canadian Locomotive Company
 Columbia and Cowlitz Railway
 Cheshire Lines Committee, a railway in Great Britain
 Clear Lake City STOLport, IATA code for the defunct airport formerly located in southeast Houston
 Mercedes-Benz CLC-Class

Other
 Campaign Legal Center, a U.S. nonprofit working to advance voting rights and transparent democratic processes
 Cambodian Labour Confederation, a Cambodian national trade union centre
 Cambridge Latin Course, a secondary school Latin programme
 Canada Lands Company, a Canadian Crown corporation
 Canadian Labour Congress, a Canadian national trade union centre
 Canadian Location Code, for forecast regions
 Central Land Council, an Indigenous land council in Northern Territory, Australia
 CLC (group), a South Korean girl group
 Collegiate Licensing Company
 Combat Logistics Company, units within the United States Marine Corps
 Community legal centres, independent not for profit organisations in Australia
 Crazy, Lovely, Cool, Nigerian movie
 Croatian Language Corpus, a text corpus of Croatian compiled at the Institute of Croatian Language and Linguistics
 International Convention on Civil Liability for Oil Pollution Damage, an international maritime treaty